Steven Lawrence Kramer is Professor Emeritus of Geotechnical Engineering at the University of Washington.

Education
Steve Kramer received his B.S. (1977), M.Eng. (1979), and Ph.D. (1985) in Civil Engineering from the University of California, Berkeley.

Professional career
Kramer joined the University of Washington faculty in 1984, where he researched liquefaction, seismic slope stability and dynamic soil behavior. Kramer also held positions at the International Centre for Geohazards at the Norwegian Geotechnical Institute and the European School for Advanced Studies in the Reduction of Seismic Risk (the ROSE School) at the University of Pavia. He retired in 2020.

He authored the first textbook on Geotechnical Earthquake Engineering and co-led the multi-institution Next Generation Liquefaction project, sponsored by the U.S. Nuclear Regulatory Commission, the U.S. Bureau of Reclamation, several transportation agencies, and others.

Kramer has contributed technical consulting to a range of infrastructure projects, such as the Alaskan Way Viaduct replacement in Seattle and the Millennium Tower (San Francisco) mediation.

Kramer was elected a member of the National Academy of Engineering in 2020, for contributions to geotechnical earthquake engineering, including liquefaction, seismic stability, and seismic site response.

Awards
Walter L. Huber Civil Engineering Research Prize, 1996
ASCE Norman Medal, 2009 and 2017
ASCE H. Bolton Seed Medal, 2018
Academy of Distinguished Alumni, Civil Engineering, University of California Berkeley, 2020
National Academy of Engineering, 2020

References

External links 
 Steve Kramer profile at the University of Washington

Members of the United States National Academy of Engineering
University of Washington faculty
Engineering academics
American civil engineers
Living people
Year of birth missing (living people)
UC Berkeley College of Engineering alumni
20th-century American engineers